Vladimír Karbusický (9 April 1925, in Velim – 23 May 2002, in Hamburg) was a Czech musicologist and folklorist.

During World War II, he was abducted by the Germans for forced labor in Hamburg. After returning to Prague, he worked for the Ethnographic Institute of the Czechoslovak Academy of Sciences. He collected Jewish jokes, but was prevented from publishing them due to their often anti-authoritarian qualities which threatened the Czechoslovak Communist Party. After emigrating to West Germany in 1969, he published a book, Jewish Anecdotes from Prague, in which he collected jokes about Prague's Jewish population, which had nearly been wiped out during the Holocaust.

References

External links
Biography (in Czech)

1925 births
2002 deaths
Czech anti-communists
Czech exiles
Czechoslovak emigrants to Germany
Czech musicologists
Czech folklorists
People from Kolín District
Czechoslovak World War II forced labourers
20th-century musicologists